Tau Ophiuchi (τ Oph) is a multiple star in the constellation Ophiuchus, approximately 167 light years away based on parallax. Its two main components are two yellow-white main sequence stars, A, of magnitude 5.24 and class F2V, and B, of magnitude 5.94 and class F5V, orbiting each other with a period of 257 years and eccentricity around 0.77. A is reported as a spectroscopic binary with a smaller star of 0.29 solar masses orbiting it every 186 days. An additional component, C, has a separation of 100.8" and magnitude 11.28.

References

Ophiuchus (constellation)
F-type main-sequence stars
Ophiuchi, Tau
BD-08 4549
Ophiuchi, 69
088404
164764
6733